Boonville Airport , formerly Q17, is a public airport located one mile (1.6 km) northwest of the central business district (CBD) of Boonville, a town in Anderson Valley in Mendocino County, California, United States. It is mostly used for general aviation.

Facilities 

 Runway 13/31: 3,240 x 50 ft (988 x 15 m), surface: asphalt

References

External links 

Airports in Mendocino County, California

Boonville Airport web page